The FIS Nordic World Ski Championships 1982 took place on 19–28 February 1982 in Oslo, Norway at the Holmenkollen ski arena. This was Oslo's record-tying fourth time hosting the event after previously doing so in 1930, the 1952 Winter Olympics, and 1966. The Nordic combined 3 × 10 km team event and the ski jumping team large hill events were added to these championships. It was also the year in which cross country competitions had the freestyle (or skating) technique debuted and that electronic timing returned to scoring the results in tenths of a second after Sweden's Thomas Wassberg edged out Finland's Juha Mieto by 0.01 seconds in the men's 15 km event at the 1980 Winter Olympics in Lake Placid. The timing of the event in tenths of a second has continued as of 2011 in all Nordic skiing events.

Men's cross country

15 km
23 February 1982

30 km
20 February 1982

Bill Koch, who developed the freestyle technique used in cross-country skiing, was the first American to medal at the FIS Nordic World Ski Championships.

50 km
27 February 1982

4 × 10 km relay
25 February 1982

Women's cross country

5 km
22 February 1982

10 km
19 February 1982

20 km
26 February 1982

4 × 5 km relay
24 February 1982

Men's nordic combined

15 km Individual
19 February 1982

3 × 10 km team
24 February 1982

Men's ski jumping

Individual normal hill
21 February 1982

Individual large hill
28 February 1982

Team large hill
26 February 1982

Medal table

References

Sources
 FIS 1982 Cross country results some facts in the FIS result tables are incorrect!
 FIS 1982 Nordic combined results
 FIS 1982 Ski jumping results

Footnotes

FIS Nordic World Ski Championships
Nordic Skiing
1982 in Nordic combined
1982 in Norwegian sport
Ski jumping competitions in Norway
February 1982 sports events in Europe
Nordic skiing competitions in Norway
1980s in Oslo
Holmenkollen